Eric Bustos (born 4 April 1970) is a Bolivian judoka. He competed in the men's half-middleweight event at the 1992 Summer Olympics.

References

External links
 

1970 births
Living people
Bolivian male judoka
Olympic judoka of Bolivia
Judoka at the 1992 Summer Olympics
Place of birth missing (living people)